Kwon Young-jin (born January 23, 1991) is a South Korean football player who plays as a midfielder for Liga 1 club PSMS Medan.

References

External links
soccerway.com

1991 births
Living people
South Korean footballers
J2 League players
Mito HollyHock players
Association football midfielders